The Lying Life of Adults is an Italian- and Neapolitan-language coming-of-age drama television series created by Edoardo De Angelis, based on the 2019 novel of the same name by Elena Ferrante. It was released internationally by Netflix on 4 January 2023.

Cast
 Giordana Marengo as Giovanna
 Alessandro Preziosi as Andrea 
 Pina Turco as Nella
 Raffaella Rea as Costanza
 Biagio Forestieri as Mariano
 Valeria Golino as Vittoria
 Rossella Gamba as Angela
 Azzurra Mennella as Ida
 Susy Del Giudice as Margherita
 Giuseppe Brunetti as Corrado
 Maria Vera Ratti as Giuliana
 Gianluca Spagnoli as Tonino
 Adriano Pantaleo as Rosario
 Giovanni Buselli as Roberto

Episodes

Reception
According to Metacritic, which assigned a weighted average score of 79 out of 100 based on 7 critics, the series received "generally favorable reviews". Rebecca Nicholson of The Guardian wrote, "When I read The Lying Life of Adults, I thought of it as a very internal and inward-looking story, but this version breathes new life into it, turns it outwards, and adds a touch of rocket fuel."

References

External links
 
 

2020s Italian drama television series
2023 Italian television series debuts
Italian-language Netflix original programming
Italian-language television shows
Television shows set in Italy
Television series based on works by Elena Ferrante
Television series set in the 1990s
Naples in fiction